Alejandro Gómez (born 14 August 1991) is an inactive Colombian tennis player.

Gómez has a career high ATP singles ranking of 352, achieved on 20 March 2017. He also has a career high ATP doubles ranking of 161 achieved on 8 August 2022.

Gómez made his ATP main draw singles debut at the 2015 Claro Open Colombia where he qualified for the main draw, defeating Felipe Rojas, Andrés Molteni and Juan Ignacio Londero in the qualifying rounds. In the main draw, he defeated fifth-seed Marcos Baghdatis in the first round, but lost to the Japanese Tatsuma Ito in the second round

Gómez has a very fast and accurate serve, though one of his weaknesses are his frequent double faults , he has an average of 11 double faults per game. In fact, he recorded a 227 km/h at the 2015 Claro Open Colombia

In August 2022, Gómez was suspended from competition after testing positive for cocaine. He was required to serve a period of ineligibility of fourteen months; that period starts on 15 December 2021, and ends on 14 February 2023.

Finals: 15 (9–6)

Singles: 6 (4–2)

Doubles: 14 (8–6)

Notes

References

External links

1991 births
Living people
Colombian male tennis players
Sportspeople from Cali
21st-century Colombian people
Doping cases in tennis